Peter Boakye-Ansah (29 July 1949 – 19 July 2018) was a Ghanaian politician and a member of the 1st and 2nd parliaments of the 4th Republic of Ghana. He was a member of parliament for the Ejura Sekyedumasi constituency from 7 January 1993 to 6 January  2001.

Early life and education 
Boakye-Ansah was born in September 1949. He studied at Osei Tutu Training College where he obtained his Teachers' Training Certificate, and Bonsu Agricultural Training School where he trained as an Agricultural Field Assistant.

Career and politics 
Prior to entering politics Boakye-Ansah was a trained teacher. He was the district secretary for the Ejura Sekyedumase district prior to entering parliament. He assumed office as a member of the 1st parliament of the 4th republic of Ghana on the ticket of the National Democratic Congress on 7 January 1993 after he emerged winner at the 1992 Ghanaian parliamentary election held on 29 December 1992. During the 1996 Ghanaian General Elections, Boakye-Ansah stood for the Ejura Sekyedumase seat once again, and he polled 16,992 votes which represented 62% of the total votes cast. He served as a member of parliament for the Ejura-Sekyedumase constituency from 7 January 1993 until 6 January 2001. He was succeeded by Sampson Atakora, also of the NDC.

Personal life and death 
Boakye-Ansah was a Christian. He died on 19 July 2018 after a short illness.

References 

Ghanaian educators
Ghanaian MPs 1993–1997
Ghanaian MPs 1997–2001
1949 births
2018 deaths
Ghanaian Christians
National Democratic Congress (Ghana) politicians
People from Ashanti Region